Democratic Socialist Party may refer to:

Current parties
Party of Democratic Socialism (Czech Republic)
Arab Democratic Socialist Ba'ath Party (Syria)
Democratic Socialists (Italy)
Democratic Socialists of America
Democratic Socialist Party (Guinea-Bissau)
Democratic Socialist Party (Lebanon)
Democratic Socialist Party (Morocco)
Democratic Socialist Party (Nepal)
Democratic Socialist Party (Prabodh Chandra) (India)
Democratic Socialist Unionist Party (Syria)
Democratic Socialist Vanguard Party (Morocco)
Philippine Democratic Socialist Party

Former parties
Democratic Socialist Party (Bosnia and Herzegovina)
China Democratic Socialist Party
Democratic Socialists (Germany)
Democratic Socialist Party (Argentina)
Democratic Socialist Party (France)
Democratic Socialist Party of Greece
Democratic Socialist Party (Ireland)
Democratic Socialist Party (Japan)
Democratic Socialists '70 (Netherlands)
Italian Democratic Socialists
Italian Democratic Socialist Party
League of African Democratic Socialist Parties
Parti de la Democratie Socialiste (Quebec, Canada)
Sammarinese Democratic Socialist Party (San Marino)
Sammarinese Independent Democratic Socialist Party (San Marino)
Vietnamese Democratic Socialist Party

See also
Socialist Party (disambiguation)
Social Democratic Party
Socialist Democratic Party (disambiguation)
Party of Democratic Socialism (disambiguation)